Sládkovič is a name, possibly referring to:

 Andrej Sládkovič (1820–1872), Slovak poet, publicist, critic and translator
 4781 Sládkovič, a main belt asteroid

Slovak-language surnames